This is a list of some of the forests in the United Kingdom. Care should be taken to distinguish extensive wooded areas from royal forests which may never have been particularly wooded within historical times.

England

North
Cheshire
Delamere Forest
Mersey Forest
Macclesfield Forest

Cumbria
Grizedale Forest
Whinfell Forest
Whinlatter Forest
Ennerdale Forest
Blengdale Forest
Dodd Wood
Parkgate and Irton Forest

County Durham
 Hamsterley Forest

Lancashire
Gisburn Forest

Northumberland
Kielder Forest

Yorkshire
Dalby Forest
Wykeham Forest

Midlands
Forest of Mercia
 National Forest
West Midlands County
Black Country Urban Forest

Shropshire
Morfe Forest
Mortimer Forest

Staffordshire
Cannock Chase
Kinver Forest

Warwickshire
Forest of Arden
Heart of England Forest

Worcestershire
Wyre Forest (part in Shropshire)

Derbyshire
Darwin Forest

Nottinghamshire
Greenwood Forest
Sherwood Forest

Leicestershire
Charnwood Forest
Lincolnshire
 List of Forests and Woodland in Lincolnshire
Rutland
Leighfield Forest

Northamptonshire
Rockingham Forest
Salcey Forest

East
Essex
Epping Forest
Hainault Forest

Bedfordshire
Forest of Marston Vale

Hertfordshire
Heartwood Forest

Norfolk
Thetford Forest
Horsford Woods (Horsford Forest)

Suffolk
Rendlesham Forest

South east
Buckinghamshire
Burnham Beeches
Whiteleaf Hill

Hampshire
Alice Holt Forest
New Forest

Isle of Wight
Brighstone Forest
Parkhurst Forest

Kent
Bedgebury Forest

Oxfordshire
Wychwood

Surrey
Chiddingfold Forest
Swinley Forest
Winterfold Forest

Sussex
Ashdown Forest
Dallington Forest
Friston Forest
St Leonard's Forest
Worth Forest

South west
Somerset
the former Royal Forest of North Petherton
Selwood Forest
Forest of Avon

Gloucestershire
 Royal Forest of Dean
Forest of Avon

Wiltshire
Savernake Forest

Devon
Ashclyst Forest
Bellever Forest
Decoy Forest
Fernworthy Forest
Haldon Forest

Dorset
Wareham Forest
Moors Valley Country Park and Forest

Scotland
Angus
Backmuir Wood

Argyll and Bute
Argyll Forest Park

Dumfries and Galloway
Forest of Ae
Carsphairn Forest
Corriedoo Forest
Dalbeattie Forest
Dundeugh Forest
Fleet Forest
Laurieston Forest
Mabie Forest
Penninghame Forest
Eskrigg Nature Reserve

Strathspey & Badenoch
Abernethy Forest
Glenmore Forest
Rothiemurchus Forest

Fife
Tentsmuir Forest

Scottish Borders
Craik Forest
Ettrick Forest
Wauchope Forest

South Ayrshire
Arecleoch Forest
Carrick Forest
Changue Forest
Tairlaw Forest

Stirling
Queen Elizabeth Forest Park
Rowardennan Forest
Strathyre Forest

Wales
Caerfyrddin (Carmarthenshire)
Brechfa Forest
Ceredigion
Penglais Nature Park
Conwy
Gwydir Forest
Conwy/Denbighshire
Clocaenog Forest
Denbighshire
Llandegla Forest
Gwynedd
Coed-y-Brenin
Monmouthshire
Wentwood
Neath Port Talbot
Afan Forest Park
Powys
Clun Forest
Hafren Forest
Ynys Mon (Anglesey)
Newborough Forest

Northern Ireland
Ballypatrick Forest
Belvoir Forest
Castlewellan Forest Park
Drum Manor Forest Park
Ely Lodge Forest
Florence Court Forest Park
Glenariff Forest Park
Gortin Glen Forest Park
Gosford Forest Park
Lough Navar Forest Drive
Rostrevor Forest
Tollymore Forest Park

Classification
Ancient woodland
List of Ancient Woods in England
Community forests in England
Royal forest
List of forests managed by the Forestry Commission

See also
Forestry in the United Kingdom
Crown Estate
English Lowlands beech forests
Forestry Commission

External links
 

 
Forests in the United Kingdom
United Kingdom